Tender Is the Night is the fourth and final novel completed by American writer F. Scott Fitzgerald. Set in French Riviera during the twilight of the Jazz Age, the 1934 novel chronicles the rise and fall of Dick Diver, a promising young psychiatrist, and his wife, Nicole, who is one of his patients. The story mirrors events in the lives of the author and his wife Zelda Fitzgerald as Dick starts his descent into alcoholism and Nicole descends into mental illness.

Fitzgerald began the novel in 1925 after the publication of his third novel The Great Gatsby. During the protracted writing process, the mental health of his wife rapidly deteriorated, and she required extended hospitalization due to her suicidal and homicidal tendencies. After her hospitalization in Baltimore, Maryland, the author rented the La Paix estate in the suburb of Towson to be close to his wife, and he continued working on the manuscript.

While working on the book, Fitzgerald was beset with financial difficulties and drank heavily. He borrowed money from both his editor Max Perkins and his agent Harold Ober as well as wrote short stories for commercial magazines. Fitzgerald completed the work in Fall 1933, and Scribner's Magazine serialized the novel in four installments between January and April 1934 before its publication on April 12, 1934. Although artist Edward Shenton illustrated the serialization, he did not design the book's jacket. The jacket was by an unknown artist, and Fitzgerald disliked it. 
The title is taken from the poem "Ode to a Nightingale" by John Keats.

Two versions of the novel are in print. The first version, published in 1934, uses flashbacks; the second, revised version, prepared by Fitzgerald's friend and noted critic Malcolm Cowley on the basis of notes for a revision left by Fitzgerald, is ordered chronologically and was first published posthumously in 1948. Critics have suggested that Cowley's revision was undertaken due to negative reviews of the temporal structure of the first version of the book.

Fitzgerald considered the novel to be his masterwork. Although it received a tepid response upon release, it has grown in acclaim over the years and is now regarded as among Fitzgerald's best works. In 1998, the Modern Library ranked the novel 28th on its list of the 100 best English-language novels of the 20th century.

Plot summary 

Dick and Nicole Diver are a glamorous couple who rent a villa in the South of France and surround themselves with a coterie of American expatriates. Rosemary Hoyt, a 17-year-old actress, and her mother are staying at a nearby resort. Rosemary becomes infatuated with Dick and becomes close to Nicole.

Rosemary senses something is wrong with the couple, and her suspicions are confirmed when another guest at a party, Violet McKisco, reports witnessing Nicole's nervous breakdown in a bathroom. Tommy Barban, another guest, comes to the defense of Nicole and insists that Violet is lying. Angered by this accusation, Violet's husband Albert duels Barban on the beach, but both men miss their shots. Following these events, Dick, Nicole, Rosemary, and others depart the French Riviera.

Soon after, Rosemary is now a constant companion of both Dick and Nicole in Paris. She attempts to seduce Dick in her hotel room, but he rebuffs her advances, although he admits that he loves her. Much later, a black man named Jules Peterson is found murdered in Rosemary's bed at the hotel, a potential scandal which could destroy Rosemary's career. Dick moves the blood-soaked body out of the room to cover up any implied sexual relationship between Rosemary and Peterson.

A flashback occurs in the narrative. In Spring 1917, Dick Diver—a promising young doctor—visits psychopathologist Franz Gregorovious in Zürich, Switzerland. While visiting Franz, he meets a patient named Nicole Warren, a wealthy young woman whose sexual abuse by her father has led to mental neuroses. Over a period of time they exchange letters. With the permission of Franz who believes that Dick's friendship benefits Nicole's well-being, they start seeing each other. As Nicole's treatment progresses, she becomes infatuated with Dick who, in turn, develops Florence Nightingale syndrome. He determines to marry Nicole in order to provide her with lasting emotional stability.

Dick is offered a partnership in a Swiss psychiatric clinic by Franz, and Nicole uses her finances to pay for the enterprise. After his father's death, Dick travels to America for the burial and then journeys to Rome in hopes of seeing Rosemary. They start a brief affair which ends abruptly and painfully. A heartbroken Dick is involved in an altercation with the Italian police and is physically beaten. Nicole's sister helps him to get out of jail. After this public humiliation, his incipient alcoholism increases. When his alcoholism threatens his medical practice, Dick's ownership share of the clinic is purchased by American investors following Franz's suggestion.

Dick and Nicole's marriage disintegrates as he pines for Rosemary who has become a successful Hollywood star. Nicole distances herself from Dick as his self-confidence and friendliness turn into sarcasm and rudeness towards everyone. His constant unhappiness over what he could have been fuels his alcoholism, and Dick becomes embarrassing in social and familial situations. A lonely Nicole enters into an affair with Tommy Barban. She later divorces Dick and marries her lover.

Major characters 

 Richard "Dick" Divera promising young psychiatrist and Yale alumnus who marries his patient Nicole Diver and becomes an alcoholic.
 Nicole Diver (née Warren)an affluent mental patient who was the victim of incest and who marries Dick Diver. Based on Zelda Fitzgerald.
 Rosemary Hoytan eighteen-year-old Hollywood actress who falls in love with Dick Diver. Based on teenage starlet Lois Moran.
 Tommy Barbana Franco-American soldier-of-fortune with whom Nicole Diver has an affair. Based on French aviator Edouard Jozan, and on Italian-American pianist composer Mario Braggiotti.
 Franz Gregoroviousa Swiss psychopathologist at Dohmler's clinic who introduces a young Dick Diver to Nicole Warren, his patient.
 Beth "Baby" Warrenan unmarried spinster who is Nicole's older sibling and who disapproves of her marriage to Dick Diver. 
 Abe Northan alcoholic composer who is later murdered in a New York speakeasy. Based on Ring Lardner and Charles MacArthur.
 Mary Norththe spirited wife of Abe North who divorces him, remarries, and becomes the wealthy Countess of Minghetti.
 Albert McKiscoan American novelist who wins a duel against Tommy Barban. Based on novelist Robert McAlmon.
 Violet McKiscothe gossipy spouse of Albert McKisco who discovers Nicole's insanity and attempts to malign her reputation.
 Jules Petersona black man from Scandinavia who helps Abe North and is later found dead in Rosemary Hoyt's hotel suite.

Background and composition

Sojourn in Europe 
 
While abroad in Europe, F. Scott Fitzgerald began writing his fourth novel almost three weeks after the publication of The Great Gatsby in April 1925. He planned to tell the story of Francis Melarkey, a young Hollywood technician visiting the French Riviera with his domineering mother. Francis falls in with a circle of charming American expatriates, emotionally disintegrates, and kills his mother. Fitzgerald's tentative titles for the novel were "World's Fair," "Our Type" and "The Boy Who Killed His Mother." The characters of the charming American expatriates were based on Fitzgerald's acquaintances Gerald and Sara Murphy and were named Seth and Dinah Piper. Francis was intended to fall in love with Dinah, an event that would precipitate his disintegration.

Fitzgerald wrote five drafts of this earlier version of the novel in 1925 and 1926, but he was unable to finish it. Nearly all of what he wrote made it into the finished work in altered form. Francis's arrival on the Riviera with his mother, and his introduction to the world of the Pipers, was transposed into Rosemary Hoyt's arrival with her mother, and her introduction to the world of Dick and Nicole Diver. Characters created in this early version survived into the final novel, particularly Abe and Mary North (originally Grant) and the McKiscos.

Several incidents such as Rosemary's arrival and early scenes on the beach, her visit to the Riviera movie studio, and the dinner party at the Divers' villa all appeared in this original version, but with Francis in the role of the wide-eyed outsider that would later be filled by Rosemary. Also, the sequence in which a drunken Dick is beaten by police in Rome was written in this first version as well and was based on a real incident that happened to Fitzgerald in Rome in 1924.

Return to America 
 
After a certain point, Fitzgerald became stymied with the novel. He, Zelda, and their daughter Scottie returned to the United States in December 1926 after several years in Europe. Film producer John W. Considine Jr. invited Fitzgerald to Hollywood during its golden age to write a flapper comedy for United Artists. He agreed and moved into a studio-owned bungalow with Zelda in January 1927. In Hollywood, the Fitzgeralds attended parties where they danced the black bottom and mingled with film stars.

While attending a lavish party at the Pickfair estate, Fitzgerald met 17-year-old Lois Moran, a starlet who had gained widespread fame for her role in Stella Dallas (1925). Desperate for intellectual conversation, Moran and Fitzgerald discussed literature and philosophy for hours while sitting on a staircase. Fitzgerald was 31 years old and past his prime, but the smitten Moran regarded him as a sophisticated, handsome, and gifted writer. Consequently, she pursued a relationship with him. The starlet became a muse for the author, and he wrote her into a short story called "Magnetism", in which a young Hollywood film starlet causes a married writer to waver in his sexual devotion to his wife. Fitzgerald later rewrote Rosemary Hoyt—one of the central characters in Tender is the Night—to mirror Moran.

Jealous of Fitzgerald's relationship with Moran, an irate Zelda set fire to her expensive clothing in a bathtub as a self-destructive act. She disparaged the teenage Moran as "a breakfast food that many men identified with whatever they missed from life." Fitzgerald's relations with Moran further exacerbated the Fitzgeralds' marital difficulties and, after merely two months in Hollywood, the unhappy couple departed for Delaware in March 1927.

Fitzgerald supported himself and his family in the late 1920s with his lucrative short-story output for slick magazines such as the Saturday Evening Post, but he was haunted by his inability to progress on the novel. Around 1929 he tried a new angle on the material, starting over with a shipboard story about a Hollywood director Lew Kelly and his wife Nicole as well as a young actress named Rosemary. But Fitzgerald only completed two chapters of this version.

Zelda's mental illness 

By Spring 1929, the Fitzgeralds had returned to Europe when Zelda's mental health deteriorated. During an automobile trip to Paris along the mountainous roads of the Grande Corniche, Zelda seized the car's steering wheel and tried to kill herself, her husband F. Scott Fitzgerald, and their 9-year-old daughter Scottie by driving over a cliff. After this homicidal incident, Zelda sought psychiatric treatment, and doctors diagnosed her with schizophrenia in June 1930. Zelda's biographer, Nancy Milford, quotes Dr. Oscar Forel's contemporary psychiatric diagnosis: 

Seeking a cure for her mental illness, the couple traveled to Switzerland where Zelda underwent further treatment at a clinic. Zelda's ingravescent mental illness and the death of Fitzgerald's father in 1931 dispirited the author. Devastated by these events, an alcoholic Fitzgerald settled in suburban Baltimore where he rented the La Paix estate from architect Bayard Turnbull. He decided the novel's final plot would involve a young man of great potential who marries a mentally-ill woman and sinks into despair and alcoholism when their doomed marriage fails.

Final draft and publication 
Fitzgerald wrote the final version of Tender Is the Night in 1932 and 1933. He salvaged almost everything he had written for the earlier Melarkey draft of the novel, as well as borrowed ideas and phrases from many short stories he had written in the years since completing The Great Gatsby. Ultimately, he poured everything he had into Tender—his feelings regarding his wasted talent and self-perceived professional failure; his animosity towards his parents; his marriage to Zelda and her ingravescent mental illness; his infatuation with actress Lois Moran, and Zelda's affair with the French aviator Edouard Jozan.

Fitzgerald completed the work in Fall 1933, and Scribner's Magazine serialized the novel in four installments between January and April 1934 before its publication on April 12, 1934. Although artist Edward Shenton illustrated the serialization, he did not design the book's jacket. The jacket was by an unknown artist, and Fitzgerald disliked it. The title is taken from the poem "Ode to a Nightingale" by John Keats.

Critical reception 

Fitzgerald deemed the novel to be his masterwork and believed it would eclipse the acclaim of his previous works. It was instead met with lukewarm sales and mixed reviews. One book review in The New York Times by critic J. Donald Adams was particularly harsh:

In contrast to the negative review in The New York Times, critic Burke Van Allen hailed the novel as a masterpiece in a April 1934 review in The Brooklyn Daily Eagle:

Three months after its publication, Tender Is the Night had sold only 12,000 copies compared to This Side of Paradise which sold over 50,000 copies. Despite a number of positive reviews, a consensus emerged that the novel's Jazz Age setting and subject matter were both outdated and uninteresting to readers. The unexpected failure of the novel puzzled Fitzgerald for the remainder of his life.

Various hypotheses have arisen as to why the novel did not receive a warmer reception upon release. Fitzgerald's friend, author Ernest Hemingway, opined that critics had initially only been interested in dissecting its weaknesses, rather than giving due credit to its merits. He argued that such overly harsh criticism stemmed from superficial readings of the material and Depression-era America's reaction to Fitzgerald's status as a symbol of Jazz Age excess. In his later years, Hemingway re-read the work and remarked that, in retrospect, "Tender Is the Night gets better and better".

Posthumous reevaluation 
Following Fitzgerald's death in 1940, Tender Is the Nights critical reputation has steadily grown. Later critics have described it as "an exquisitely crafted piece of fiction" and "one of the greatest American novels". It is now widely regarded as among Fitzgerald's most accomplished works, with some agreeing with the author's assessment that it surpasses The Great Gatsby.

Several critics have interpreted the novel to be a feminist work and posited that the patriarchal attitudes of the reactionary 1930s underlay the critical dismissal. They have noted the parallels between Dick Diver and Jay Gatsby, with many regarding the novel and particularly Diver's character, as Fitzgerald's most emotionally and psychologically complex work.

Christian Messenger argues that Fitzgerald's book hinges on the sustaining sentimental fragments: "On an aesthetic level, Fitzgerald's working through of sentiment's broken premises and rhetoric in Tender heralds a triumph of modernism in his attempt to sustain his sentimental fragments and allegiances in new forms." He calls it "F. Scott Fitzgerald's richest novel, replete with vivid characters, gorgeous prose, and shocking scenes," and calls attention to Slavoj Žižek's use of the book to illustrate the nonlinear nature of experience.

Legacy and influence 
In 1998, the Modern Library included the novel at #28 on its list of the 100 best English-language novels of the 20th century. Radcliffe later included it at #62 in its rival list. NPR included it at #69 on its 2009 list titled 100 Years, 100 Novels. In 2012 it was listed as one of the 1001 Books You Must Read Before You Die.

Adaptations 

In 1962, a film adaptation was released with Jason Robards as Dick Diver and Jennifer Jones as Nicole Diver. The song "Tender Is the Night" from the movie soundtrack was nominated for the 1962 Academy Awards for Best Song.

Two decades later, in 1985, a television mini-series of the book was co-produced by the BBC, 20th Century Fox Television, and Showtime Entertainment. The mini-series featured Peter Strauss as Dick Diver, Mary Steenburgen as Nicole Diver, and Sean Young as Rosemary Hoyt.

In 1995, a stage adaptation by Simon Levy, with permission of the Fitzgerald Estate, was produced at The Fountain Theatre, Los Angeles. It won the PEN Literary Award in Drama and several other awards.

Boris Eifman's 2015 ballet Up and Down is based loosely on the novel.

References

Notes

Citations

Works cited

External links 

 

1934 American novels
Fiction set in 1913
Fiction set in 1925
Adultery in novels
American autobiographical novels
American novels adapted into films
Feminist novels
Modernist novels
American novels adapted into television shows
Novels by F. Scott Fitzgerald
Novels first published in serial form
Novels set in France
Novels set in the Roaring Twenties
Psychological novels
Roman à clef novels
Works originally published in Scribner's Magazine
Nonlinear narrative novels
Incest in fiction